Zalipais lissa is a species of minute sea snail, a marine gastropod mollusc in the family Skeneidae.

Description
The height of the shell attains 0.6 mm, its diameter 1.0 mm. The thin, yellowish-white shell is minute and has a discoidal shape. It is umbilicated. To the naked eye the shell appears to be quite smooth, but under magnification reveals subequidistant, strongly undulating, radiate threads. No spiral sculpture is visible. The spire is flat, the nucleus only being slightly raised. The protoconch consists of one smooth whorl, which is convex, and the first half
very often slightly elevated. The teleoconch consists of two whorls, the last one flatly convex above. The periphery and the baseof the shell are rounded. The suture is impressed. The subcircular aperture is a little angled above. The continuous peristome is sharp. The outer lip is advancing, and producing a distinct notch at the suture. The columella is arcuate and slightly thickened. The open umbilicus is moderate.

Distribution
This marine species occurs off New Zealand and off the Tasmanian coast.

References

 Powell A. W. B., New Zealand Mollusca, William Collins Publishers Ltd, Auckland, New Zealand 1979 
 Cotton, B. C. (1959). South Australian Mollusca. Archaeogastropoda. Adelaide. : W.L. Hawes. 449 pp., 1 pl.
 Spencer, H.G.; Marshall, B.A.; Maxwell, P.A.; Grant-Mackie, J.A.; Stilwell, J.D.; Willan, R.C.; Campbell, H.J.; Crampton, J.S.; Henderson, R.A.; Bradshaw, M.A.; Waterhouse, J.B.; Pojeta, J. Jr (2009). Phylum Mollusca: chitons, clams, tusk shells, snails, squids, and kin, in: Gordon, D.P. (Ed.) (2009). New Zealand inventory of biodiversity: 1. Kingdom Animalia: Radiata, Lophotrochozoa, Deuterostomia. pp. 161–254.

lissa
Gastropods of New Zealand
Gastropods described in 1908